Koottukad is a small village in Parur Taluk, Ernakulam district of Kerala state, South India. It is about 25 km from Ernakulam town. It has a large expanses of green plain.

The famous church named Little Flower church is situated here. The people in this greenish place are very friendly as the name denotes. A small LP School named Santa cruz Lp school - having 85 years of past memories - is in this place.

The beautiful Cherai beach is only 8 km from this place.

See also
North Paravur
Paravur Taluk
Ernakulam District
Kochi

References 

Villages in Ernakulam district